Lightnin' and the Blues is a 12-inch LP album by blues musician Lightnin' Hopkins, collecting twelve tracks recorded in 1954 that were originally released as 7-inch singles on the Herald Records label. From the late 1980s, other Herald tracks began appearing on collections like The Herald Recordings – 1954 and The Herald Recordings Vol. 2 before a 30-track CD edition was released in 2016.

Track listing
All compositions by Sam "Lightnin'" Hopkins
 "Nothin' But the Blues" – 2:22
 "Don't Think Cause You're Pretty" – 2:40
 "Lightnin's Boogie" – 2:35
 "Life I Used to Live" – 2:49
 "Sick Feelin' Blues" – 2:15
 "Evil Hearted Woman" – 2:47
 "Blues for My Cookie" – 2:27
 "Sittin' Down Thinkin'" – 2:45
 "My Baby's Gone" – 2:46
 "Lonesome in Your Home" – 2:45
 "Lightnin's Special" – 2:22
 "My Little Kewpie Doll" – 2:23
 "Let's Move" – 2:19 Additional track not on original LP
 "Had a Gal Called Sal" – 2:17 Additional track not on original LP
 "Shine on Moon" – 2:40 Additional track not on original LP
 "Don't Need No Job" – 2:18 Additional track not on original LP
 "Early Mornin' Boogie" – 2:14 Additional track not on original LP
 "Blues Is a Mighty Bad Feeling" – 2:27 Additional track not on original LP
 "Boogie Woogie Dance" – 2:36 Additional track not on original LP
 "Please Don't Go Baby" – 2:44 Additional track not on original LP
 "Finally Met My Baby" – 2:22 Additional track not on original LP
 "That's Alright Baby" – 3:01 Additional track not on original LP
 "I Love You Baby" – 2:30 Additional track not on original LP
 "Grandma's Boogie" – 2:35 Additional track not on original LP
 "Hear Me Talkin'" – 2:16 Additional track not on original LP
 "Lightnin's Stomp" – 2:39 Additional track not on original LP
 "Lightnin' Don't Feel Well" – 3:22 Additional track not on original LP
 "Flash Lightnin'" – 2:29 Additional track not on original LP
 "Shine on Moon" – 2:36 Additional track not on original LP	
 "Hopkin's Sky Hop" – 2:14 Additional track not on original LP

Personnel
Lightnin' Hopkins – guitar, vocals

References

Lightnin' Hopkins albums
1960 albums
Herald Records albums